Zhang Qichao (born February 22, 1992) is a Chinese short track speed skater. She won one distance and became third overall at the 2008 World Junior Championships in Bolzano.

Career highlights
ISU World Junior Short Track Speed Skating Championships
2008 - Bolzano,  3rd overall classification
1st at 500 m

External links
ISU profile
2008 ISU World Junior Championships, Italy

1992 births
Living people
Chinese female speed skaters
Chinese female short track speed skaters